Lepidoblepharis buchwaldi is a species of gecko, a lizard in the family Sphaerodactylidae. The species is endemic to Ecuador.

Etymology
The specific name, buchwaldi, is in honor of Otto von Buchwald (1843–1934), a German engineer, anthropologist, and naturalist, who worked in Ecuador.

Geographic range
L. buchwaldi is found in western Ecuador, in the foothills of the Andes.

Habitat
It has also been found in artificial habitats such as cacao, mango, and orange plantations.

Description
The holotype of L. buchwaldi measures  in total length, of which the head and body make up .

Reproduction
L. buchwaldi is oviparous.

References

Further reading
Rösler H (2000). "Kommentierte Liste der rezent, subrezent und fossil bekannten Geckotaxa (Reptilia: Gekkonomorpha)". Gekkota 2: 28–153. (Lepidoblepharis buchwaldi, p. 90). (in German).

Lepidoblepharis
Reptiles described in 1910
Reptiles of Ecuador
Endemic fauna of Ecuador